Hero Cup may refer to:

 Hero Cup (golf), a professional golf team event first played in 2023
 1993 Hero Cup, a cricket tournament held in India